Seven Persons is a hamlet in Alberta, Canada within Cypress County.

The hamlet is located in Census Division No. 1 and in the federal riding of Medicine Hat—Cardston—Warner.

Etymology 
The hamlet is names after Seven Persons Creek, and there are various stories about the origin of the creek's name, according to The Mysteries of Canada website.

Demographics 

See also 
List of communities in Alberta
List of designated places in Alberta
List of hamlets in Alberta
Red Rock Coulee

References 

Cypress County
Hamlets in Alberta
Designated places in Alberta
Latter-day Saint settlements in Canada